The Border Film Project is an art project examining United States–Mexico border immigration from two perspectives. The project gave disposable cameras to two groups on different sides of the United States–Mexico border: illegal migrants crossing the desert and the Minutemen volunteers trying to stop them. Photos reveal facets of the dispute previously unavailable to the public: men hopping fences, riding trucks, and sleeping in the desert. The photographs are now displayed at art galleries across the country  and a book was released on April 1, 2007, through Harry N. Abrams.

References

Related Reading
 Susan Harbage Page and Inés Valdez, "Residues of Border Control", Southern Spaces, 17 April 2011.

External links 
 Official site

Mexico–United States border